Martin Ruland the Elder (1532, in Freising – 3 February 1602), also known as Martinus Rulandus or Martin Rulandt, was a German physician and alchemist. He was a follower of the physician Paracelsus.

His son, Martin Ruland the Younger (1569–1611), also became a renowned physician and alchemist.

Presumably the elder of the two published "Centuries" of cures titled "Curationum empiricarum et historicarum Centuria" in 10 volumes from 1578 to 1596 in Basel.

1532 births
1602 deaths
People from Freising
16th-century German physicians
German alchemists
16th-century German writers
16th-century German male writers
16th-century alchemists